The dove pan is a classic magic effect in which a magician produces a dove from an empty pan.  The illusion continues to be performed by professional and amateur magicians.

Effect
In presentation, the magician demonstrates that the pan is empty and then fills it with a small quantity of a volatile liquid which is ignited.  Often, the magician will place other items in the pan (e.g. cracking an egg into it) before setting the fuel on fire.  To extinguish the fire, the magician slams the lid onto the pan.  When the magician removes the lid, a dove flies from the pan which is shown to be otherwise empty.

Method
The gimmick of the dove pan lies in the design of the lid. The deep shouldered rim of the lid conceals an additional pan (or liner) that fits snugly into the main pan. When the lid is placed on the pan the liner is deposited inside it, resembling the main pan when it was displayed empty. The liner, when fitted into the lid, may be loaded with birds (or anything else the magician wishes to produce) before the trick begins. The magician must not show the underside of the lid to the audience while performing the trick.

The effect consists of a shallow pan made of brass or aluminium and a matching lid which has a very deep rim or shoulder all around that fits inside the pan when closed. The pan is usually no more than ten inches in diameter and roughly 2-3 inches deep.  Dove pans are a common item at magicians' supply stores.

References
Hay, Harry. Cyclopedia of Magic. (1949) 

Magic tricks